The 2017 NCAA Division II Football Championship Game was a postseason college football game that determined a national champion in NCAA Division II for the 2017 season. It was played at Children's Mercy Park in Kansas City, Kansas, on December 16, 2017, with kickoff at 5:00 p.m. EST (4:00 p.m. local CST), and television coverage on ESPN2.

Teams
The participants of the 2017 NCAA Division II Football Championship Game were the finalists of the 2017 Division II Playoffs, which began with four 7-team brackets to determine super region champions, who then qualified for the national semifinals. The game featured the winners of those national semifinal games: No. 4 seed West Florida and No. 2 seed Texas A&M–Commerce. This was the first meeting between the two teams and the first appearance for both teams in the championship game.

National semifinals
Super region champions were seeded 1 to 4 for the national semifinals.

Game summary

Statistics

References

Championship Game
NCAA Division II Football Championship Games
Texas A&M–Commerce Lions football games
West Florida Argonauts football games
American football in Kansas
NCAA Division II Football Championship Game
NCAA Division II Football Championship Game